Barbara Kassab-Every was a Dutch painter born on the Caribbean island of Saba who lived in St. Kitts.

Biography 
Barbara Kassab was born in 1945 on the island of Saba in the Netherlands Antilles. Beginning at a young age, Kassab started painting landscapes of her home of Saba, including portrayals of the hills and iconic winding roads of the island. One of these pictures depicting an s-shaped road was presented to the Queen of the Netherlands on one of her visits to the Netherlands Antilles.

Kassab had one brother, Floyd Every. After moving to St. Kitts, she married Bichara Kassab and had two children: Brian and Sandra. She had an art studio in her home in the Fortlands.

Works 
Barbara Kassab's works have been exhibited in Canada, Guyana, Barbados, St. Kitts, Curaçao, and other Caribbean islands. Her paintings include:

 Iveora Flower
 Landing at Fort Bay, Olden Days (Saba)
 Road to Mount Scenery (Saba)
 Golden Profiles
 Local House (Saba)
In 2009, one of Kassab's acrylic landscape paintings was given as a gift to a member of the United States of America's Federal Reserve Board.

References 

1945 births
2016 deaths
20th-century women artists
21st-century women artists
Women from Saba (island)
Dutch women in politics